Yangzhou Taizhou International Airport , often abbreviated to Yangtai Airport, is an airport serving the cities of Yangzhou and Taizhou in central Jiangsu Province. Another major city, Zhenjiang, is also nearby across the Yangtze River.

History
The airport is jointly constructed and owned by the cities of Yangzhou (80% share) and Taizhou (20% share), with a total investment of 2.082 billion yuan.  The airport was opened on 7 May 2012.  During the design and construction stage it was called Suzhong Jiangdu Airport (Suzhong means "Central Jiangsu"), but was renamed in November 2011 to reflect the names of the main cities it serves. The name plate at the airport was a calligraphy work of former CCP leader Jiang Zemin, a native of Yangzhou.

Facilities
Designed as a domestic regional airport (class 4C), the airport's runway was originally 2,400 meters long and 45 meters wide. It has a 31,000 square-meter terminal building and 13 aircraft parking aprons.  It was designed to handle an annual throughput of 2 million passengers and 24,000 tons of cargo by 2020.

In December 2018, the runway was extended to 3,200 meters and the airport was upgraded to class 4E. It is now capable of handling long-range, four-engine aircraft such as the Boeing 747 and the Airbus A340.

Airlines and destinations

See also
List of airports in China
List of the busiest airports in China

References

External links
 Yangzhou Taizhou Airport, at the Yangzhou City Government web site. 

Airports in Jiangsu
2012 establishments in China
Airports established in 2012
Buildings and structures in Yangzhou
Taizhou, Jiangsu